"Show Me the Way" is a song by the English rock musician Peter Frampton. Originally released in June 1975 as the lead single from his fourth studio album Frampton, it gained popularity after being recorded live and released in February 1976 as the lead single from his live album Frampton Comes Alive! In the US, the song reached number 6 on the Billboard Hot 100 and number 10 on the UK Singles Chart, becoming his biggest US hit until "I'm in You" in 1977.

Cash Box said of the studio single that "Peter turns in a dynamic performance both instrumentally and vocally" and that "his highly emotive vocals are matched by some of his usually dexterous guitar playing". Record World said that "Frampton's voice and guitar are crisp and the song is a scintillating treat for the ears."

Like "Do You Feel Like We Do," another single from the Frampton Comes Alive! album, the song prominently features a talk box effects pedal.

Track listing

1975 release
7" vinyl - United States (1975)
 "Show Me the Way" - 3:18
 "The Crying Clown" - 4:05

Live version
7" vinyl - United States (1976)
 "Show Me the Way" - 3:25
 "Shine On" - 3:35

Chart performance

Weekly charts

Year-end charts

Later versions
The American alternative rock band Dinosaur Jr recorded it as a bonus track on the 1987 album You're Living All Over Me. In May 2000, Peter Frampton revisited it in a performance with the Foo Fighters, on Late Show with David Letterman. It was also recorded in 2014 by Jake Kitchin for use as background music television commercials for Uncle Ben's Beginners rice. Frampton recorded the song again as a version for acoustic guitar for his 2016 CD Acoustic Classics.

References

External links
 
 

1975 singles
1976 singles
European Hot 100 Singles number-one singles
Dutch Top 40 number-one singles
Peter Frampton songs
Songs written by Peter Frampton
Song recordings produced by Peter Frampton
Live singles
1975 songs
A&M Records singles